The 2022 NBL season was the 41st season of the National Basketball League. For the second year in a row, the league fielded 10 teams, with the only changes being the rebrand of the Auckland Huskies to Auckland Tuatara and Taranaki Mountainairs to Taranaki Airs.

The regular season commenced on 28 April in Nelson with the Nelson Giants hosting the Otago Nuggets at the Trafalgar Centre. The season contained 15 weeks of regular season games followed by a four-day finals schedule in August.

Team information

Summary

Regular season standings

Finals

Awards

Performance of the Week

Statistics leaders
Stats as of the end of the regular season

Regular season
 Most Valuable Player: Xavier Cooks (Wellington Saints)
 Most Outstanding Guard: Jarrod West (Nelson Giants)
 Most Outstanding NZ Guard: Corey Webster (Franklin Bulls)
 Most Outstanding Forward: Xavier Cooks (Wellington Saints)
 Most Outstanding NZ Forward/Centre: Robert Loe (Auckland Tuatara)
 Scoring Champion: Anthony Hilliard (Taranaki Airs)
 Rebounding Champion: John Bohannon (Manawatu Jets)
 Assist Champion: Jarrod West (Nelson Giants)
 Most Improved Player: Sam Dempster (Nelson Giants)
 Defensive Player of the Year: Jarrod West (Nelson Giants)
 Youth Player of the Year: Dontae Russo-Nance (Auckland Tuatara)
 Coach of the Year: Michael Fitchett (Nelson Giants)
 All-Star Five:
 G: Jarrod West (Nelson Giants)
 G: Anthony Hilliard (Taranaki Airs)
 F: Javonte Douglas (Taranaki Airs)
 F: Xavier Cooks (Wellington Saints)
 C: Chris Johnson (Auckland Tuatara)

Finals
 Grand Final MVP: Keith Williams (Otago Nuggets)

References

External links
2022 season preview
2022 schedule
Original season fixtures from December 2021
Updated season fixtures from February 2022
2022 free agency tracker
Finals preview @ stuff.co.nz
Finals preview @ nznbl.basketball
Grand Final replay on YouTube

National Basketball League (New Zealand) seasons
NBL